Lorenzo Maitani (c. 1275–1330) was the Italian architect and sculptor primarily responsible for the construction and decoration of the façade of Orvieto Cathedral.

Maitani established his reputation in Siena and was called to supervise the construction at Orvieto in 1308 when the unprecedented height and span of the cathedral's vaults and arches presented unforeseen difficulties. In 1310 he received the title capomaestro of the cathedral and became, in addition, overseer of bridges and civic buildings.

The design of the cathedral's façade is considered to be Maitani's most important work. Though his contributions to the façade as a sculptor are difficult to determine, it may be assumed that his sensibility dictated the overall scheme. Two of the panels attributed to Maitani, "Scenes from Genesis" and "The Last Judgment," are delicate bas-reliefs unified by an ascending vine that suggests a French Gothic influence. Sculptures generally attributed to Maitani include the bronze "Eagle of St. John" and the "Angel of St. Matthew."

External links
Works of Maitani

1255 births
1330 deaths
Gothic architects
Gothic sculptors
14th-century Italian architects
13th-century Italian sculptors
Italian male sculptors
14th-century Italian sculptors